Another Dimension is the 15th studio album by musician Bo Diddley recorded in 1971 and released by the Chess label.

Reception

Allmusic awarded the album 2 stars with reviewer Bruce Eder stating "By the end of 1970, most of Bo Diddley's income was derived from his concert work, primarily as an "oldies" act in rock 'n roll revival shows such as the Toronto concert where he shared a stage with the Plastic Ono Band. But he and Chess believed there was still a way for him to try and reach a wider, more contemporary audience. This album was the result, a valiant effort to update Bo Diddley's sound and image, somewhat in the vein of Muddy Waters' Electric Mud, only a few years later, and only slightly more successful in that quest".

Track listing 
 "The Shape I'm In" (Robbie Robertson) – 3:27
 "I Love You More Than You'll Ever Know" (Al Kooper) – 7:38
 "Pollution" (Kay McDaniel) – 4:49
 "Bad Moon Rising" (John Fogerty) – 2:46
 "Down on the Corner" (Fogerty) – 3:28
 "I Said Shutup Woman" (McDaniel) – 3:38
 "Bad Side of the Moon" (Elton John, Bernie Taupin) – 3:05
 "Lodi" (Fogerty) – 3:14
 "Go for Broke" (John Berganti, Mike Mattia, Don Olsen, Carl Schickler) – 3:07

Personnel 
Bo Diddley – vocals, guitar, percussion
Mike Mattia – trumpet, keyboards
Carl Schickler – trombone, guitar
Eddie Covi – saxophone
Al Kooper – keyboards, guitar
Bob Gallo – guitar, percussion
Sonny Hahn – guitar
Don Olsen – bass
John Birganti – drums 
Bob Dorsa, Vince Traina – percussion 
Cookie Vee – percussion, vocals
Kathy Alson, Leslie Zimei - vocals

References 

1971 albums
Chess Records albums
Bo Diddley albums